Trippi may refer to:

Trippi (album), album by Finnish singer Sanni Kurkisuo
Trippi (surname)

See also
Tripi (disambiguation)
Trippie Redd (born 1999), American rapper
Trippy (disambiguation)